David Allen Moates is a former Major League Baseball outfielder. He played all or part of three seasons in the major leagues, from  until , for the Texas Rangers.

Professional life 
Dave Moates was drafted by the San Diego Padres in the 12th round of the 1968 MLB June Amateur Draft from State College of Florida, Manatee-Sarasota and the Washington Senators (which later became the Texas Rangers) in the 4th round of the 1969 MLB June Draft-Secondary Phase from Florida State University. in 1977 he joined the New York Yankees. He played four Major League seasons and six seasons in the minors, winning two AAA championships and one A championship as well as Player of the Year honors.  In 1993 Dave Moates returned to the State College of Florida as an assistant baseball coach for the SCF Manatees.

Personal information
Moates was born on January 30, 1948, in Great Lakes, IL.  He studied at the State College of Florida, Manatee-Sarasota and the Florida State University.

Sources

References

Major League Baseball outfielders
Texas Rangers players
Wytheville Senators players
Burlington Senators players
Pittsfield Senators players
SCF Manatees baseball players
Denver Bears players
Spokane Indians players
Syracuse Chiefs players
Tucson Toros players
Baseball players from Illinois
1948 births
Living people
People from Great Lakes, Illinois
Florida State Seminoles baseball players
State College of Florida, Manatee–Sarasota alumni